Aileen M. Gunther (born 1953/1954) is a Democratic member of the New York State Assembly representing the 100th district.

Gunther received a nursing degree from Orange County Community College. Gunther earned a national certification in infection control, a Nursing Degree from Orange County Community College and attended State University of New York, New Paltz for a degree in Liberal Arts.

She is a registered nurse with 29 years experience.
Gunther is an HIV counselor. Her professional experience includes being a New York State government liaison for the Mid-Hudson Chapter of Infection Control Practitioners, a former director for performance improvement and risk management.

She was first elected in 2003 in a special election to fill the vacancy caused by the death of her husband, Jacob E. Gunther III. She ran uncontested in the 2004, 2006, 2008, and 2010 general elections.

Gunther lives in Forestburgh, where she and her husband raised their three children: Mary Alice, Jacob IV, and Caitlin.

Election results
 November 2003 special election, NYS Assembly, 98th AD
{| class="Wikitable"
| Aileen M. Gunther (DEM - WOR) || ... || 20,207
|-
| Alan J. Sorensen (REP - CON) || ... || 11,399
|}

 November 2004 general election, NYS Assembly, 98th AD
{| class="Wikitable"
| Aileen M. Gunther (DEM - WOR) || ... || 31,108
|-
| (uncontested) ||  || 
|}

 November 2006 general election, NYS Assembly, 98th AD
{| class="Wikitable"
| Aileen M. Gunther (DEM - CON) || ... || 22,625
|-
| (uncontested) ||  || 
|}

 November 2008 general election, NYS Assembly, 98th AD
{| class="Wikitable"
| Aileen M. Gunther (DEM - IND - CON) || ... || 22,625
|-
| (uncontested) ||  || 
|}

 November 2010 general election, NYS Assembly, 98th AD
{| class="Wikitable"
| Aileen M. Gunther (DEM - CON) || ... || 25,299
|-
| (uncontested) ||  || 
|}

 November 2012 general election, NYS Assembly, 100th AD
{| class="Wikitable"
| Aileen M. Gunther (DEM - IND - WOR) || ... || 31,299
|-
| Gary D. Linton (REP || ...  || 12,528 
|}

 November 2014 general election, NYS Assembly, 100th AD
{| class="Wikitable"
| Aileen M. Gunther (DEM - IND - WOR) || ... || 19,561
|-
| (uncontested) ||  || 
|}

 November 2016 general election, NYS Assembly, 100th AD
{| class="Wikitable"
| Aileen M. Gunther (DEM - IND - WOR) || ... || 
|-
| (uncontested) ||  || 
|}

 November 2018 general election, NYS Assembly, 100th AD
{| class="Wikitable"
| Aileen M. Gunther (DEM - IND - WOR) || ... || 
|-
| (uncontested) ||  || 
|}

 November 2020 general election, NYS Assembly, 100th AD
{| class="Wikitable"
| Aileen M. Gunther (DEM - IND - WOR) || ... || 
|-
| (uncontested) ||  || 
|}

References

External links
New York State Assembly member website

1950s births
Living people
Democratic Party members of the New York State Assembly
Women state legislators in New York (state)
21st-century American politicians
21st-century American women politicians